is the 27th single by Japanese entertainer Miho Nakayama. Written by Nakayama and Joe Hisaishi, the single was released on July 7, 1993, by King Records.

Background and release
"Anata ni Nara..." was recorded in London and used as the theme song of the Toho film Samurai Kids. The B-side, "Holiday", was used by Asahi Soft Drinks for their Tea Quality commercials.

"Anata ni Nara" peaked at No. 8 on Oricon's weekly singles chart. It sold over 280,000 copies and was certified Gold by the RIAJ.

Hisaishi self-covered the song in English as "I Believe in You" on his 1995 album Melody Blvd.

Track listing

Charts

Certification

References

External links

1993 singles
1993 songs
Japanese-language songs
Miho Nakayama songs
King Records (Japan) singles